Pasal Kau!, also known as All Because of You!, is a 2020 Malaysian Malay-language action romantic comedy film. It tells the story of two hotel workers named Aiman and Jane, who discovers their feelings towards each other when the seaside luxury hotel is suddenly held hostage by kidnappers.

It was released on 1 October 2020 on Netflix.

The film is directed by Adrian Teh. It is the first Netflix Malaysian original film.

Synopsis 
Hotel staff Aiman (Hairul Azreen) is a happy-go-lucky boy working at a seaside resort hotel. His female colleague, Jane (Janna Nick) has a secret crush on him. One day Aiman falls in love with a guest Sofia. But things go worse when the hotel is suddenly held hostage by a group of kidnappers. Aiman and his friends must band together to come up with an action-packed plan to save the day. And Aiman might discover that his heart may lie with someone else after all. How will their story go?

Cast 
 Hairul Azreen as Aiman
 Janna Nick as Jane
 Amerul Affendi as Parjo
 Henley Hii as Josh
 Namron as Maznan
 Theebaan G as MC
 Taufiq Hanafi as Wak
 Hafizul Kamal as Yop
 Josiah Hogan as Tengku Iskandar
 Sophia Albarakbah as Sofia
 Sugeeta Chandran as Maria
 Anna Jobling as Emelia

 Ropie Cecupak as Jet 
 Dain Iskandar Said as Duke
 Yayan Ruhian as Maman
 Jasmine Suraya Chin as herself 
 Fify Azmi as Vee
 Ismi Melinda as Zain

Production 
The film is adapted from an idea pitched by Hairul Azreen. It features almost all actors and actresses from director Adrian Teh's previous films Paskal: The Movie (2018) and Wira (2019), with new cast Janna Nick as one of the main characters. It was filmed in Desaru Coast, Johor.

Originally scheduled to be released theatrically, the film was then bought by streaming platform Netflix as originals.

References

External links 
 
 

Malaysian romantic comedy films
2020 romantic comedy films
2020 action comedy films